Alan Carey (born 11 February 1968) is an Irish sprint canoer who competed in the late 1980s and early 1990s. At the 1988 Summer Olympics in Seoul, he was eliminated in the semifinals of the K-2 500 m event. Four years later, at the 1992 Summer Olympics, Carey was eliminated in the repechages of both the K-2 500 m and the K-2 1000 m events.

References
Sports-Reference.com profile

1968 births
Canoeists at the 1988 Summer Olympics
Canoeists at the 1992 Summer Olympics
Irish male canoeists
Living people
Olympic canoeists of Ireland